Furqan Ahmad is an Indian politician from Uttarakhand and a two term Member of the Uttarakhand Legislative Assembly. Furqan represents the Piran Kaliyar (Uttarakhand Assembly constituency). Furqan is a member of the Indian National Congress.

Elections contested

References
 http://myneta.info/utt2012/candidate.php?candidate_id=293
 http://myneta.info/uttarakhand2017/candidate.php?candidate_id=447

Living people
Indian National Congress politicians from Uttarakhand
People from Haridwar district
Uttarakhand MLAs 2017–2022
Year of birth missing (living people)
Uttarakhand MLAs 2022–2027